Satisfied is a 1979 album by Rita Coolidge, released on A&M Records.  The album is notable for containing Coolidge's comeback single, "I'd Rather Leave While I'm in Love", as well as for its perceived unique musical direction at the time of its release.

History

The album contains Coolidge's comeback single, "I'd Rather Leave While I'm in Love", as well as Coolidge's version of The Chiffons' "One Fine Day", which was also released as a single.   The album has been described as comparable in significance to Dusty Springfield's Dusty in Memphis album, released ten years earlier.

Track listing

Side one
"One Fine Day" (Gerry Goffin, Carole King) – 4:00
"The Fool in Me" (Dave Loggins, Randy Goodrum) – 4:21
"Trust It All to Somebody" (Donna Weiss, Lenny Macaluso) – 4:11
"Let's Go Dancin'" (Booker T. Jones) – 5:19

Side two
"Pain of Love" (Johnny Bristol) – 4:00
"I'd Rather Leave While I'm in Love" (Carole Bayer Sager, Peter Allen) – 3:29
"Sweet Emotion" (Priscilla Jones) – 4:08
"Crime of Passion" (Mary Unobsky, Danny Ironstone) – 4:57
"Can She Keep You Satisfied" (Rita Coolidge, Priscilla Jones) – 4:46

Charts

References

Rita Coolidge albums
1979 albums
Albums produced by David Anderle
Albums produced by Booker T. Jones
A&M Records albums
Albums recorded at Sunset Sound Recorders